Execution is the act of putting a person to death, in execution of a judicial sentence of death, which is also known as capital punishment.

Execution may also refer to:

Society
A term for contract killings
The term also refers to execution-style murder
 Extrajudicial killing, the killing of a person by governmental authorities without the sanction of any judicial proceeding or legal process 
Summary execution,  the act of killing a person  who is accused of a crime without benefit of a full and fair trial
A writ of execution, ordering the enforcement of a judgment, typically by seizing and selling goods to satisfy a judgment debt

Technology
Execution (computing), the process in which a computer carries out instructions of a computer program

Media and art
Execution (novel), a 1958 fictional work by the Canadian author and war veteran Colin McDougall
Execution (painting), a 1995 Chinese art painting
"Execution" (The Twilight Zone), a 1960 episode of The Twilight Zone
Execution (1968 film), a 1968 Italian film
Execution, also known as Stark Raving Mad, a 1981 American film
Execution (album), an album by Tribuzy
 Execution: The Discipline of Getting Things Done, a 2002 business book by Larry Bossidy and Ram Charan

See also
Execute (disambiguation)
The Execution (disambiguation)